Great Destiny is a 1973 historical novel by Mongolian author Sonomyn Udval. The novel relates the story of Commander Khatanbaatar Magsarjab and his pathway through revolution.

References

1973 novels
Novels by Sonomyn Udval
Historical novels